Kitseküla (Estonian for "Goat Village") is a subdistrict of the district of Kesklinn (Midtown) in Tallinn, the capital of Estonia. It has a population of 4,053.

Kitseküla is situated between two railway corridors so there are several stations surrounding it: "Tallinn-Väike" on the Tallinn–Pärnu/Viljandi line; "Lilleküla", "Tondi" and "Järve" on Tallinn–Paldiski/Turba line and "Kitseküla" on Tallinn–Aegviidu line. All these stations are served by Elron trains.

Lilleküla Stadium, the home ground of the Estonia national football team and FC Flora football club, is located in the northwestern corner of Kitseküla, between the diverging railway lines.

Gallery

References

Subdistricts of Tallinn
Kesklinn, Tallinn